The Michigan Senate election of 2022 occurred on November 8, 2022, to elect all 38 members to the Michigan Senate. The election  coincided with elections for all of Michigan's constitutional offices; Governor, Attorney General, Secretary of State and all 110 seats in the Michigan House of Representatives. Seats in the Michigan Senate were last elected in 2018. Democrats won control of the chamber for the first time in 38 years.

Background
This was the first election to take place after redistricting based on the 2020 United States census. Following a voter-passed constitutional amendment in 2018, the state legislature  no longer creates legislative and congressional districts and was replaced by Michigan's Independent Citizens Redistricting Commission, a 13-member bipartisan committee.

Term-limited members
Under the Michigan Constitution, state representatives and senators are limited to twelve years combined in either chamber of the legislature, after voters approved on November 8 a constitutional amendment that revised term limits. Until this election, members of the state Senate were able to serve only two four-year terms, and members of the House of Representatives were limited to three two-year terms. Michigan has what is considered the toughest term limits in the country. The following members are prevented by previous term limits from seeking re-election to the Senate in 2022. This list does not include members that are eligible for re-election, but chose instead to seek other office or voluntarily retire.

Republicans (5)
16th district: Mike Shirkey
17th district: Dale Zorn
32nd district: Kenneth Horn
36th district: Jim Stamas
37th district: Wayne Schmidt

Democrats (2)
23rd district: Curtis Hertel Jr.
27th district: Jim Ananich

Predictions

Results

Closest races 
Seats where the margin of victory was under 10%:
 
  (gain)
 
  (gain)
 
  (gain)

General election

All results below are from the certified election results posted by the Secretary of State.

District 1

District 2

District 3

District 4

District 5

District 6

District 7

District 8

District 9

District 10

District 11

District 12

District 13

District 14

District 15

District 16

District 17

District 18

District 19

District 20

District 21

District 22

District 23

District 24

District 25

District 26

District 27

District 28

District 29

District 30

District 31

District 32

District 33

District 34

District 35

District 36

District 37

District 38

See also 
 2022 Michigan House of Representatives election

References 

2022 Michigan elections
Michigan Senate elections
Michigan Senate